Ciani may refer to:

People:
Antonio Ber Ciani (1907–2001), Argentine actor and film director
Dino Ciani (1941–1974), Italian pianist
Marco Ciani (born 1987), Guatemalan footballer
Michaël Ciani (born 1984), French professional footballer
Sergio Ciani or Alan Steel (1935–2015), Italian bodybuilder and actor
Suzanne Ciani (born 1946), Italian American pianist and music composer

Aircraft:
Ciani Crib or SSVV EC.41/64 Crib, a single seat, high performance glider designed and built in Italy in the 1960s
Ciani Eventuale, an Italian glider sometimes known as the SSVV EC 40/62 Eventuale
Ciani Spillo or SSVV EC.37/53 Spillo, a single seat competition glider designed and built in Italy in the 1950s
Ciani Urendo, or SSVV EC 38/56 Urendo, an Italian tandem-seat training glider from the 1950s
Ciani Uribel, a single seat sailplane designed and built in Italy in the late 1950s

See also

Chianina
Chianni
Chihani
Cian
Cianci
Luciani
Ucciani
Varciani